The Tesina is an Italian river that runs in the Veneto region, in the north-east of Italy. Its source is at Cibalde, a locality in the commune of Sandrigo. It flows in the Bacchiglione river near San Pietro Intrigogna, in the territory of Vicenza.

External links

Waterways of Italy
Rivers of Italy
Rivers of the Province of Vicenza